Argayashsky District is an administrative and municipal district (raion), one of the twenty-seven in Chelyabinsk Oblast, Russia. It is located in the north of the oblast. Its administrative center is the rural locality (a selo) of Argayash. Population:  42,808 (2002 Census);  The population of Argayash accounts for 24.3% of the district's total population.

The district was part of the Bashkir Autonomous Socialist Soviet Republic until 1934, and together with neighboring Kunashaksky District, formed the exclave Argayash Canton.  The two districts were added to Chelyabinsk Oblast as the Argayash National Okrug, which itself only survived until November 1934.

Notable people
Kadir Rakhimovich Timergazin, Soviet geologist

References

Notes

Sources

Districts of Chelyabinsk Oblast